Bronisław Geremek (born Benjamin Lewertow; 6 March 1932 – 13 July 2008) was a Polish social historian and politician. He served as Member of Parliament (1991–2001), Minister of Foreign Affairs (1997–2000), leader of the Freedom Union (2000–2001), as well as Member of the European Parliament (2004–2008).

Early life and education 
Bronisław Geremek was born as Benjamin Lewertow in Warsaw on 6 March 1932. His father Boruch Lewertow, a fur merchant, was murdered in Auschwitz. His mother, Sharca, and he were smuggled out of the Warsaw Ghetto in 1943 and were sheltered by Stefan Geremek. Stefan Geremek later married Bronisław's mother and Bronisław was further raised in a Roman Catholic tradition. In his adult life, he considered himself neither a Jew nor a Catholic. His grandfather was a maggid, his brother Jerry, lived in New York as a Jew, and his sons living in Poland are Roman Catholics.

In 1954, Bronisław Geremek graduated from the Faculty of History at the Warsaw University. In 1956–1958, he completed postgraduate studies at the École pratique des hautes études in Paris. He completed his PhD in 1960 and he was granted a postdoctoral degree at the Polish Academy of Sciences (PAN) in 1972. He was appointed associate professor in 1989.

The chief domain of Geremek's scholarly work was research on the history of culture and medieval society. His scholarly achievements included numerous articles and lectures, as well as ten books, which have been translated into ten languages. His doctoral thesis (1960) concerned the labour market in medieval Paris, including prostitution. His postdoctoral thesis (1972) concerned underworld groups in medieval Paris.

Most of Geremek's scholarly career was connected with the Institute of History of the Polish Academy of Sciences, where he worked from 1955 to 1985. From 1960 to 1965, he was also a lecturer at the Sorbonne in Paris and the manager of the Polish Culture Centre of that university. Geremek was given honorary degrees by the University of Bologna, Utrecht University, the Sorbonne, Columbia University, Waseda University, and Jagiellonian University in Kraków. In 1992, he was designated visiting professor at the Collège de France. He was a member of Academia Europaea,  the PEN Club, the Société Européenne de Culture, fellow of Collegium Invisibile and numerous other societies and associations. He was a longtime professor and Chairholder of the Chair of European Civilisation at the College of Europe until his death.

Political activity

History of Poland (1945–1989) 
In 1950, Geremek joined the Polish United Workers' Party (PZPR). He was the second secretary of the Basic Party Organisation (POP) of the PZPR at Warsaw University. In 1968, however, he left the party in protest against the Warsaw Pact invasion of Czechoslovakia.

During the 1970s, Geremek was considered one of the leading figures in the Polish democratic opposition. In 1978, he co-founded the Society for Educational Courses, for which he gave lectures. While on a Fellowship at the Wilson Center in Washington DC, he met General Edward Rowny who introduced him to Lane Kirkland and Ronald Reagan. In August 1980, he joined the Gdańsk workers' protest movement and became one of the advisers of the Independent Self-Governing Trade Union Solidarność (Polish for "Solidarity") – NSZZ. In 1981 he chaired the Program Commission of the First National Convention of Solidarity. After martial law was declared in December 1981, he was interned until December 1982, when he once again became an adviser to the then-illegal Solidarity, working closely  with Lech Wałęsa. In 1983, he was again arrested by the Polish authorities.

History of Poland (1989–2008)

Polish Round Table Agreement 
Between 1987 and 1989, Geremek was the leader of the Commission for Political Reforms of the Civic Committee, which prepared proposals for peaceful democratic transformation in Poland. In 1989, he played a crucial role during the debates between Solidarity and the authorities that led to free parliamentary elections and the establishment of the ‘Contract Sejm’.

Third Polish Republic 
Geremek then became one of the founders of The Democratic Union (later merged into The Freedom Union) and was the leader of the Democratic Union's parliamentary group from 1990 to 1997. After the elections in 1991, President Lech Wałęsa asked him to form a new government, but Geremek failed to do so and Jan Olszewski was appointed Prime Minister instead.

From 1989 to 2001, Geremek was a member of the lower house of the Polish parliament, the Sejm, and chairman of the Political Council of the Freedom Union. He chaired the Sejm's Committee on Foreign Affairs from 1989 to 1997, its Constitutional Committee from 1989 to 1991 and its European Law Committee from 2000 to 2001.

After a coalition government was formed in October 1997 by the Solidarity Electoral Action (AWS) and the Freedom Union, Geremek served as Minister of Foreign Affairs under Prime Minister Jerzy Buzek until 2000. In 1998, Poland chaired OSCE, and Bronisław Geremek served as Chairperson-in-Office. In March 1999, he signed the treaty under which Poland joined NATO.

European Parliament Deputy 

In the election to the European Parliament in June 2004, Geremek was elected as a candidate of the Freedom Union, winning the largest number of votes in Warsaw. In the European Parliament he was a member of the Alliance of Liberals and Democrats for Europe. He was a believer in the idea of Europe, though he felt that there is a need to create a clear European identity and the need for people to believe in the benefits that Europe can bring to them - not just as nations, but also as individuals.

In April 2007, Geremek refused to declare that he had never collaborated with the Communist secret service, which he was being asked to do under a new vetting law. In May 2007, the Constitutional Tribunal of the Republic of Poland rejected most of the new vetting law, including the clause that would have made it mandatory for nearly 700,000 Poles to sign declarations certifying that they had never collaborated with the secret services under the old regime.

From 2006 to 2008, he was president of the Jean Monnet Foundation for Europe. He was a supporter of the Campaign for the Establishment of a United Nations Parliamentary Assembly.

Honours
 2004: Order of the Three Stars
 2002: Order of the White Eagle
 Knight Grand Cross in the Order of Leopold II
 2002: Knight Grand Cross of Order of the Cross of Terra Mariana
 2000: Order of Merit of the Italian Republic
 Knight Commander's Cross of the Order of Merit of the Federal Republic of Germany
 2002: Pour le Mérite
 Officer in the Legion of Honour
 1999: Golden Plate Award of the American Academy of Achievement
 1998: Karlspreis (Charlemagne Award) of the city of Aachen
 1997: Commander's Cross of the Order of the Lithuanian Grand Duke Gediminas
 Grand prix de la francophonie of the Académie française

Death 
Geremek died on 13 July 2008, in a car accident on the then national road 2 (nowadays national road 92) near Lubień in Nowy Tomyśl County, when the car he was driving hit an oncoming van on the opposite lane, due to Geremek falling asleep behind the wheel. He was granted a state funeral, held in Warsaw in the Cathedral of St John. It was attended, among others, by President Lech Kaczyński, Prime Minister Donald Tusk, and three former presidents Ryszard Kaczorowski, Lech Wałęsa and Aleksander Kwaśniewski.

Posthumous honours 
In January 2009, the European Parliament named the main courtyard of the "Louise Weiss", its principal building, after Bronisław Geremek.

Publications 
 Litość i szubienica: dzieje nędzy i miłosierdzia (Czytelnik 1989)
 Świat "opery żebraczej": obraz włóczęgów i nędzarzy w literaturach europejskich XV-XVII wieku (Państwowy Instytut Wydawniczy 1989)
 Rok 1989 – Bronisław Geremek opowiada, Jacek Żakowski pyta (red.: Maria Braunstein; Plejada, Dom Słowa Polskiego 1990)
 The Margins of Society in Late Medieval Paris (Past and Present Publications)  by Jean-Claude Schmitt, Bronislaw Geremek, Lyndal Roper, Jean Birrell
 Wspólne pasje (wespół z Georgesem Duby; rozmowę przeprowadził Philippe Sainteny ; przeł. Elżbieta Teresa Sadowska; PWN 1995)
 Szansa i zagrożenie. Polityka i dyplomacja w rodzinnej Europie (Studio EMKA 2004)

Translations 
 Fernand Braudel, Historia i trwanie (seria: "Nowy Sympozjon"; przedmową opatrzyli Bronisław Geremek i Witold Kula; Czytelnik 1971, 1999)

References

External links 

 On the Side of Geremek Adam Michnik eulogizes Geremek in The New York Review of Books
Bronislaw Geremek's opinion editorial commentaries for Project Syndicate

1932 births
2008 deaths
Burials at Powązki Military Cemetery
Writers from Warsaw
Road incident deaths in Poland
Polish medievalists
Knights Commander of the Order of Merit of the Federal Republic of Germany
Ministers of Foreign Affairs of Poland
Jewish Polish politicians
20th-century Polish historians
Polish male non-fiction writers
Cultural historians
Academic staff of the University of Paris
Polish United Workers' Party members
Recipients of the Pour le Mérite (civil class)
Recipients of the Grand Cross of the Order of Leopold II
Solidarity (Polish trade union) activists
University of Warsaw alumni
Members of Academia Europaea
Fellows of Collegium Invisibile
Members of the Polish Sejm 1991–1993
Members of the Polish Sejm 1993–1997
Members of the Polish Sejm 1997–2001
Democratic Party – demokraci.pl politicians
Freedom Union (Poland) MEPs
MEPs for Poland 2004–2009
Recipients of the Order of the Cross of Terra Mariana, 1st Class
Warsaw Ghetto inmates
Polish dissidents
Polish Round Table Talks participants
Herder Prize recipients
Recipients of the Four Freedoms Award
Recipients of the Order of the White Eagle (Poland)